Diplonephra is a genus of moths of the family Noctuidae.

Species
 Diplonephra ditata (Lucas, 1892)

References
Natural History Museum Lepidoptera genus database
Diplonephra at funet

Hadeninae